Bloomington Township is a township in Muscatine County, Iowa, in the United States. 

It had a population of 24,082 in 2018. 

The township's elevation is listed as 689 feet above mean sea level.

References

Townships in Muscatine County, Iowa
Townships in Iowa